Uglara may refer to:

, a village near Gjilan
Uglara, Fushë Kosova, a village near Fushë Kosova
, a village near Zubin Potok

See also
Ugljare (disambiguation)